Jan Tříska (4 November 1936 – 25 September 2017) was a Czech actor who played over 160 roles across stage, film, and television. He worked in the United States after emigrating there in the 1970s, but later returned to his native country following the Velvet Revolution. He was a three-time Czech Lion Award nominee, for Best Actor in Leading Role (Lunacy, 2005), and twice for Best Supporting Actor (Rád, 1994; Up and Down; 2004).

Biography
Tříska was born in Prague on November 4, 1936. He studied at the Academy of Performing Arts in Prague. After graduating in 1959, he became the youngest member to join the National Theatre, where he acted in Karel Čapek's The White Disease and Vilém Mrštík's Maryša. He also worked with Otomar Krejča's Za Branou Theater (Divadlo za branou: 'Theatre Behind the Gate') and in municipal theatres throughout Prague. He appeared in many Czechoslovak films, and was the official Czech-language dubber of Jean-Paul Belmondo from 1965 to 1977.

Life and career in the United States
After signing the Charter 77 proclamation, he emigrated to the United States via Cyprus and Canada. His first American film role was in Ragtime (1981), directed by fellow Czech emigre Miloš Forman. He played supporting parts in Reds (also 1981, directed by Warren Beatty), The Osterman Weekend (1983, Sam Peckinpah), 2010: The Year We Make Contact (1984, Peter Hyams), The Karate Kid Part III (1989, John G. Avildsen), Apt Pupil (1998, Bryan Singer), as well as guest appearances on Highlander: The Series (1996), and Highlander: The Raven (1999). One of his more notable roles was as Joseph Paul Franklin, the would-be-assassin of Larry Flynt, in  Miloš Forman's The People vs. Larry Flynt (1996).

Return to the Czech Republic
After the Velvet Revolution of 1989, Tříska visited the Czech Republic to perform in movies such as The Elementary School (1991), Horem pádem (2004), the Academy Award nominated Želary (2003) and  Máj (2008; based on the poem Máj by Karel Hynek Mácha). In 2002, Tříska received an Alfréd Radok Award for his performance as Lear in King Lear at the Summer Shakespeare Festival at Prague Castle. In 2005, he was nominated for the Czech Lion Award for Best Actor in Leading Role for his performance in the Jan Švankmajer film Lunacy.

Later life and death
Although he occasionally visited the Czech Republic, Tříska remained a permanent resident of the United States in Los Angeles, California.

On 23 September 2017, for reasons yet to be determined, Tříska fell from the Charles Bridge in Prague. Passengers on a nearby boat rescued him from the Vltava River, after which he was resuscitated and hospitalized in serious condition. He died in hospital two days later on 25 September 2017.3

Personal life 
Tříska was married to Czech actress Karla Chadimová (born 1943). He has two children, Jana and Karla, and two grandchildren, Augustin and Josephine.

Partial theatre credits

American National Theater 
The Children of Herakles as Iolaus
The Seagull
Idiot's Delight

New York's Public Theater 
Master and Margarita
Zastrozzi

La Jolla Playhouse 
The Hairy Ape
Arms and the Man
Cosmonaut's Last Message

Tylovo divadlo, Prague 
Srpnová neděle (1959) as Jirka (play by František Hrubín, directed by Otomar Krejča)
Don Juan (1959) as Young Boy (Molière, directed by Jaromír Pleskot)
Konec masopustu (1964) as Rafael (play by Josef Topol, directed by Otomar Krejča)
Měsíc na vsi (1965) as Aleksej N. Beljajev (play by Ivan Turgenev, directed by Rudolf Hrušínský)

Divadlo za branou 
Kočka na kolejích (1965) as Véna (Play by Josef Topol, directed by Otomar Krejča)
Three Sisters (1966) as Tuzenbach (play by Anton Chekhov, directed by Otomar Krejča)
Oidipus (1971) as Oidipus (play by Sophocles, directed by Otomar Krejča)

Národní divadlo, Prague 
Bílá nemoc (1956-1957) as first assistant (play by Karel Čapek, directed by Jaromír Pleskot)
Maryša (1956-1957) as Second Man (directed by Zdeněk Štěpánek)
Saint Jane as Page (directed by Jaromír Pleskot)
Romeo and Juliet (1963) as Romeo (National Theatre, Prague, directed by Otomar Krejča)

Others 
The Cherry Orchard: The Tempest (Guthrie Theater)
Largo Desolato (Yale Repertory Theatre, Connecticut Critics Circle Award, Outstanding Male Performance)
The Third Army (Long Wharf Theatre)
Arsenic and Old Lace (Long Wharf Theatre)
King Lear (2002) as King Lear (Summer Shakespeare Festival, Prague; Spišský hrad, Brno, directed by Martin Huba)
King Lear (1961) as Edmund (Smetanovo divadlo, directed by František Salzer)
Faust (1973) as Dr. Johann Faust (play by Johann Wolfgang Goethe, Divadlo Jaroslava Průchy, Kladno, directed by Václav Špidla)
Kumšt (2007) as Mark (play by Yasmina Reza, Divadlo na Jezerce, Prague, directed by Jan Hřebejk)

Selected filmography 

Váhavý střelec (1957)
Pět z milionu (1959) - Vašek
Kruh (1959) - Honzík
První parta (1960) - Havíř
U nás v Mechové (1960) - Lojzíček
Všude žijí lidé (1960) - Lojza Posvár
Pochodně (1961) - dělnický předák Josef Pecka
Policejní hodina (1961) - Venca
Srpnová neděle (1961) - Tomás
Kde alibi nestačí (1961) - laborant Mirek Zach
Kohout plaší smrt (1962) - Jozka
Dva z onoho sveta (1962) - Robert Ford
Tarzanova smrt (1963) - Clown
Zlaté kapradí (1963) - Jura (voice)
Mezi námi zloději (1964) - Man in Pub
Začít znova (1964) - Jan Stehlík - brigade worker (voice)
Komedie s Klikou (1964) - Rísa
Hvězda zvaná Pelyněk (1965) - Lojzík
Das Haus in der Karpfengasse (1965) - Kowlorat
Strašná žena (1965) - Honza Pokorný (voice)
Pet miliónu svedku (1965) - Vysetrovatel VB Koval
Lidé z maringotek (1966) - Acrobat Vincek
Martin a cervené sklícko (1967) - malír a zámecký pruvodce Syllaba
Hra bez pravidel (1967) - Duda
Ctyri v kruhu (1968) - Michal Donat
Kulhavý dábel (1968) - Rudolf (voice)
On the Comet (1970) - Porucík Servadac (voice)
Radúz a Mahulena (1970) - Radúz
Návstevy (1970)
Lucie a zazraky (1970) - Mikulás
Dost dobrí chlapi (1972) - Kamil Gubris
Slecna Golem (1972) - Petr
Horolezci (1973) - Miso Lapsanský
Wie füttert man einen Esel (1974) - Pepi
Arabian Nights (1974) - Narrator (voice)
Zivot na uteku (1975) - Vasek
Tetované casom (1976) - Dr. Hocko
Na samote u lesa (1976) - Dr. Václav Houdek
Desat' percent nádeje (1976) - Mato
Do posledneho dychu (1976) - Erich Fischer
 (1977) - Schwerdtfeger
Ein irrer Duft von frischem Heu (1977) - Aventuro
Talíre nad Velkým Malíkovem (1977) - Mine carpenter Salánek
Nechci nic slyset (1978) - Marek's Father (scenes deleted)
Ragtime (1981) - Special Reporter
Reds (1981) - Karl Radek
The Osterman Weekend (1983) - Andrei Mikalovich
Uncommon Valor (1983) - Gericault
Unfaithfully Yours (1984) - Jerzy Czyrek
Nothing Lasts Forever (1984) - Swedish Architect
2010: The Year We Make Contact (1984) - Alexander Kovalev
Black Eagle (1988) - Captain Valery
The Karate Kid Part III (1989) - Milos
Loose Cannons (1990) - Steckler
The Elementary School (1991) - Igor Hnizdo
Undercover Blues (1993) - Axel
Rád (1994) - Prior
The People vs. Larry Flynt (1996) - Joseph Paul Franklin
Apt Pupil (1998) - Isaac Weiskopf
Ronin (1998) - Dapper Gent
Loving Jezebel (1999) - Melvin Szabo (uncredited)
The Omega Code (1999) - 1st Prophet
Lost Souls (2000) - Melvin Szabo
Cahoots (2001) - Laphonse
The Man from Elysian Fields (2001) - Marcus (uncredited)
Rok dábla (2002)
Blizzard (2003) - Otto Brewer / Trainer
Trosecníci (2003)
Želary (2003) - Old Gorcík
Jedna ruka netleská (2003) - Otec Standy
Horem pádem (2004) - Professor Otakar Horecký
Lunacy (2005) - Marquis
Máj (2008) - Hangman
Hranari (2011) - Bishop
Bastardi 3 (2012) - Majeruv obhájce
Po strništi bos (2017) - Eda's grandfather (final film role)

References

External links

1936 births
2017 deaths
Charter 77 signatories
Czech male film actors
Czech male stage actors
Czech male television actors
Czechoslovak expatriates in the United States
Male actors from Prague
Recipients of Medal of Merit (Czech Republic)
Sun in a Net Awards winners